Australopoda is a taxon within Anomura. This monophyletic group comprises Lomisoidea, Aegloidea and Chirostyloidea.

References 

Anomura